The 2010–11 figure skating season began on July 1, 2010, and ended on June 30, 2011. During this season, elite skaters competed on the ISU Championship level at the 2011 European, Four Continents, World Junior, and World Championships. They also competed in elite competitions such as the Grand Prix series and Junior Grand Prix series, culminating in the Grand Prix Final.

Season notes 
This was the first season in which the short dance was contested in ice dance, having replaced the compulsory dance and original dance. The season's required pattern dance was the Golden Waltz (senior) or Viennese Waltz (junior), and the other portion of the dance could be a waltz, foxtrot, quickstep, or tango.

Beginning in the 2010–11 season, a rule change allowed men to do two quads in the short program, if they were different jumps. In October 2010, Kevin Reynolds became the first skater to land two quads in a short program. He landed a quad salchow-triple toe loop combo and later a solo quadruple toe-loop at the 2010 Skate Canada International.

In December 2010, there was a tie for a medal at the Junior Grand Prix Final. In the ladies' event, China's Li Zijun and Japan's Risa Shoji were tied for third with an identical total score of 149.82. Li was awarded the medal on the tiebreaker.

The season also saw the coldest temperatures in many years at a major event. In January 2011 at the European Championships, temperatures at the Swiss venue dipped to as low as minus-3 Celsius, resulting in complaints and a promise for more vigilance in the future.

During the 2010–2011 season, controversy over age falsification reached the sport of figure skating, after previously being discussed in gymnastics and other sports.   On February 14, 2011, questions emerged surrounding nine Chinese skaters. The Associated Press found that birthdates listed on the Chinese skating association's website suggested five female skaters, Sui Wenjing, Zhang Dan, Yu Xiaoyu, Geng Bingwa, and Xu Binshu, were younger than their stated ages, and four male skaters, Han Cong, Zhang Hao, Jin Yang, and Gao Yu, were older. The dates disappeared from the website by February 15. On February 17, the ISU said there were no discrepancies for Zhang Dan, Zhang Hao, and Xu Binshu between the birthdates listed on their passports, ISU registration forms and the Chinese Olympic Committee's website.

On March 14, 2011, the 2011 World Championships, scheduled to begin on March 21, were postponed due to the 2011 Tōhoku earthquake and tsunami and its aftermath, and later reassigned to Moscow, Russia. It was the first disaster affecting the World Championships in 50 years. In 1961, the entire United States team was killed in a plane crash, resulting in its cancellation. The last time a World Championships was moved was in 2000, due to an alleged broadcasting dispute, and the new host, France, had seven months to prepare, with the event held in the traditional month of March. However, the 2011 event had to be pushed back to April 24 – May 1, with only a month to prepare.

There were several slashing accidents. In September 2010, Evan Bates suffered a complete laceration of his Achilles tendon after Emily Samuelson hit him with her skate blade as she came down from a lift. In February 2011, Caydee Denney accidentally sliced Jeremy Barrett's right calf while practicing side-by-side jumps, requiring 42 stitches. In April 2011, Brian Joubert sliced his own hand while competing at the World Championships. There were two collisions during practice at international events. Canadian Patrick Chan and American Adam Rippon collided at 2010 Skate Canada International, while Japanese skaters Takahiko Kozuka and Daisuke Takahashi collided at the Grand Prix Final. Canadian pair skater Meagan Duhamel collided with her partner Eric Radford during competition at the World Championships, breaking his nose with her elbow. No skaters withdrew as a result of the accidents.

One skater was arrested – In May 2011, Israeli pair skater Evgeni Krasnapolski was charged with alleged desertion from the army. The Israeli skating federation stated, "We've asked for clarifications [about his service], and if we would have gotten them immediately Evgeni would have returned. The decision to let him stay abroad for training was a professional call made by the federation. The soldier got the (right) impression that we are handling the matter with the IDF and that he could trust the federation". In June 2011, U.S. Figure Skating reprimanded and fined Rachael Flatt, who competed at the World Championships with an undisclosed stress fracture but could have been replaced by an alternate, for not informing them of her injury.

In April 2011, the International Olympic Committee officially confirmed the introduction of a figure skating team event at the 2014 Winter Olympics. Each team will be composed of a men's and ladies single skater, a pair, and an ice dance team; ten teams may compete, with five eliminated after the short program. On June 12, 2011, it was announced that the ISU had reinstated Evgeni Plushenko by a unanimous vote.

Age eligibility 
Skaters competing on the junior level were required to be at least 13 but not 19 – or 21 for male pair skaters and ice dancers – before July 1, 2010. Those who had turned 14 were eligible for the senior Grand Prix series and senior B internationals. Those who turned 15 before July 1, 2010 were also eligible for the senior World, European, and Four Continents Championships.

Minimum scores 
It was the first season in which skaters were required to have achieved minimum technical elements scores (TES) prior to competing at the European, Four Continents, or World Championships. The minimum TES for each discipline and segment were:

Music

Partnership changes 
A number of skaters announced the end of their partnership or the formation of a new one. Listed are changes involving a partnership with at least one partner who competed at the Worlds, Europeans, Four Continents, Junior Worlds or the senior Grand Prix, or who medaled on the Junior Grand Prix circuit.

Coaching changes

Retirements 
A number of elite skaters announced their retirement from competition.

Competitions 
Key

International medalists

Men

Ladies

Pairs

Ice dance

Season's best scores
Top scores attained in international competitions as of April 30, 2011 (World Championships)

Men
Men's season's best scores.

Ladies
Ladies' season's best scores.

Pairs
Pairs season's best scores.

Ice dance
Ice dance season's best scores.

Standings and ranking

Season-end standings (top 30)

Men's singles

Ladies' singles

Pairs

Ice dance

Season's ranking (top 30)

Men's singles

Ladies' singles

Pairs

Ice dance

References 

Seasons in figure skating
2010 in figure skating
2011 in figure skating